The Maccabiah Stadium ( Itztadion HaMakabiya) was a football stadium on the Yarkon River in Tel Aviv, Israel.

Maccabiah Stadium was built in 1932 for the first Maccabiah Games and was filled to capacity for the opening ceremony. It was used by Maccabi Tel Aviv until 1969, when the team moved to the Bloomfield Stadium.

See also
Levant Fair
Sports in Israel

References

 

1932 establishments in Mandatory Palestine
1960s disestablishments in Israel
Sports venues in Tel Aviv
Defunct football venues in Israel
Maccabi Tel Aviv F.C.
Stadium